Adrián Marín Lugo (born 13 May 1994) is a Mexican professional footballer who plays as a forward.

Playing career
Marín started his career in the San Luis youth system, even leading the U20 league in scoring. He finally made his first team debut on March 18, 2012, against Puebla in a league match, coming on as a substitute in the 84th minute for Wilmer Aguirre. He went on, making five more league appearances, all as late substitutes.

Marín was loaned out to Lobos BUAP of Ascenso MX on May 31, 2013, and he went on to making 20 league appearances, all but two as part of the starting lineup. The 2013 Apertura season saw him make plenty appearances with no goals. However, he scored his first league goal in the 7th minute of a 2–1 victory against Zacatepec on January 4, 2014, the first week of the 2014 Clausura. That season, he tied for 3rd place in league with 7 goals.

After his successful season in the second division, he was called back up to San Luis in July 2014, who by then had moved to Tuxtla, Chiapas and became Chiapas F.C. He scored his first ever Liga MX goal in his 3rd game back, in a 2–1 win over Veracruz, 6 minutes after being substituted into the game for Alan Zamora.

On 10 June 2015 Marín was loaned out to América.

He played with Los Cabos of the Liga de Balompié Mexicano during the league's inaugural season in 2020–21.

References

External links
 
 

1994 births
Living people
Mexican expatriate footballers
Association football midfielders
San Luis F.C. players
Lobos BUAP footballers
Chiapas F.C. footballers
Club América footballers
Cafetaleros de Chiapas footballers
C.S. Herediano footballers
Alebrijes de Oaxaca players
Dorados de Sinaloa footballers
Liga MX players
Ascenso MX players
Liga de Expansión MX players
Liga Premier de México players
Tercera División de México players
Liga de Balompié Mexicano players
Liga FPD players
Mexican expatriate sportspeople in Costa Rica
Expatriate footballers in Costa Rica
Footballers from Nuevo León
Sportspeople from Monterrey
Primera Federación players
CD Tudelano footballers
Mexican expatriate sportspeople in Spain
Expatriate footballers in Spain
Mexican footballers